Selishte may refer to:

Selishte, Gabrovo Province, a village in the municipality of Sevlievo, in Gabrovo Province, Bulgaria. 
Selishte, Blagoevgrad Province, a village in the municipality of Blagoevgrad, in Blagoevgrad Province, Bulgaria. 
Selishtë, a municipality in Albania

See also
Seliște (disambiguation)
Selišta (disambiguation)
Selište (disambiguation)